Maraşlı is a Turkish action series by TIMS & B Productions, which premiered on ATV in January 2021, starring Burak Deniz and Alina Boz.

Plot 
Maraşlı is a retired soldier turned bookstore owner. For Maraşlı, life changed drastically after his daughter was shot. One day, a photographer named Mahur enters Maraşlı's bookstore and on that same day, she involuntarily gets involved in an incident involving the mafia. Maraşlı saves her life and from that day onwards, their fates become linked.

Cast

Episodes 
 First Season (2021)

References

External links
 

2021 Turkish television series debuts
2021 Turkish television series endings
Turkish action television series
Turkish-language television shows
Turkish drama television series
Turkish television soap operas
ATV (Turkey) original programming
Television series produced in Istanbul
Television shows set in Istanbul